"Take Me Back to Your House" is a song by English electronic music duo Basement Jaxx featuring Martina Sorbara. It was released as the second single from their fourth studio album, Crazy Itch Radio (2006), by XL Recordings. The track reached number 42 on the UK Singles Chart following its release in October 2006.

Composition
The Independent described the track as an uptempo banjo house "stomper".

Critical reception
The Independent called the track "deliriously catchy." Robert Christgau chose the song as one of his favorite tracks from the album.

Music video
The music video for the song was directed by Dougal Wilson. The video features Martina Sorbara and high stepping Cossacks and dancing bears. The Independent called the video "remarkable."

Charts

Release history

References

2006 singles
2006 songs
Basement Jaxx songs
Songs written by Felix Buxton
Songs written by Martina Sorbara
Songs written by Simon Ratcliffe (musician)
XL Recordings singles